The  is a professional wrestling championship and the top singles accomplishment in the Japanese promotion Wrestling of Darkness 666 (Triple Six). The title was established in 2018. , there have been three reigns among three wrestlers. Konaka=Pahalwan is the current champion in his first reign.

History
On December 23, 2018, Yuko Miyamoto defeated Onryo in the final of a 16-person tournament to win the inaugural title.

Inaugural tournament
The tournament to crown the inaugural 666 Chaos Openweight Champion started on February 23, 2018, at 666 vol. 81. A "first round" 26-person battle royal was held with the last 15 survivors advancing to the second round alongside Mame Endo who received an automatic bye.

Reigns

See also

Professional wrestling in Japan

Footnotes

References

External links
 666 Chaos Openweight Championship

Openweight wrestling championships